Homeobox protein Hox-C6 is a protein that in humans is encoded by the HOXC6 gene. Hox-C6 expression is highest in the fallopian tube and ovary. HoxC6 has been highly expressed in many types of cancers including prostate, breast, and esophageal squamous cell cancer.

Function 

This gene belongs to the homeobox family, members of which encode a highly conserved family of transcription factors that play an important role in morphogenesis in all multicellular organisms. Mammals possess four similar homeobox gene clusters, HOXA, HOXB, HOXC and HOXD, which are located on different chromosomes and consist of 9 to 11 genes arranged in tandem. This gene, HOXC6, is one of several HOXC genes located in a cluster on chromosome 12. Three genes, HOXC5, HOXC4 and HOXC6, share a 5' non-coding exon. Transcripts may include the shared exon spliced to the gene-specific exons, or they may include only the gene-specific exons. Alternatively spliced transcript variants encoding different isoforms have been identified for HOXC6. Transcript variant two includes the shared exon, and transcript variant one includes only gene-specific exons. HOXC6 plays a role in lymphoma. The HOXC6 isoform, HOXC6-2 is an active carcinogenic  for gastric cancer. It stimulates gastric cancer cells proliferation by acting as an oncogene. Downregulation of this gene’s isoforms could potentially lead to less proliferation of certain cancerous cells. With the HOXC6-1 isoform, there were no statistically significant effects on migration, invasion, apoptosis, or proliferation when it was downregulated. According to a study in Cancer Cell International, suppression of the HOXC6 gene plays a role in blocking the TGF-β/SMAD cascade. This then leads to the weakening of epithelial to mesenchymal transition for the cervical carcinoma.

Knock-out model 
A knockout model using small interfering RNA showed that knockout of HOXC6 was associated with apoptosis. Additionally, the presence of HOXC6 was associated with inhibition of paclitaxel-induced apoptosis. Thus, HOXC6 was demonstrated to induce proliferative activity.

See also 
 Homeobox

References

Further reading

External links 
 

Transcription factors